Lenin Rajendran was an Indian film director and screenwriter who worked in Malayalam cinema. He served as the Chairman of Kerala State Film Development Corporation from 2016 to January 2019.

Career
Beginning his film-making career as an assistant to director P. A. Backer, Rajendran made his directorial debut with Venal (1982). From his first film to his latest one, Edavappathy (2016), Rajendran has been consistent with the quality of his films, not surrendering to market forces even while using the form and stars of popular cinema.

An active member of the Communist party, Rajendran at times integrated his political orientation into his screen work: his 1985 film Meenamasithile Sooryan was about the anti-feudal upheaval of the 1940s in Kerala from a Communist viewpoint.

Swathi Thirunal (1987), a period film was a biographical work of a 19th-century king of Travancore, better known as a musical composer. While Daivathinte Vikrithikal (1992) was the cinematic adaptation of M. Mukundan's novel of the same name, Kulam (1997) was a loose adaptation of C. V. Raman Pillai's historical novel Marthandavarma, Mazha (2001) was adapted from Madhavikutty's Nashtapetta Neelambhari. One of his other films, Anyar (2003) deals with the hot topic of communal polarisation in Kerala.

His other films are Prem Nazirine Kanmanilla (1983), Puravrutham (1988), and Vachanam (1989).

Death
Lenin Rajendran died on 14 January 2019 in Apollo Hospital Chennai after a liver transplant, at the age of 67. At the time of his death, he was continuing as the Chairman of the Kerala Film Development Corporation. His dead body was taken back to his native place, and was cremated with full state honours. He is survived by his wife Dr. Ramani, son Gouthaman and daughter Parvathi.

Awards

Kerala State Film Awards
 1987 - Kerala State Film Award (Special Jury Award): Swathi Thirunal (film)
 1992 - Kerala State Film Award for Best Film: Daivathinte Vikrithikal
 1996 - Best Film with Popular Appeal and Aesthetic Value : Kulam
 2006 - Kerala State Film Award for Best Director  : Rathri Mazha
 2010 - Kerala State Film Award for Second Best Film:Makaramanju

International Film Festival of Kerala 
2010 -  FIPRESCI Prize for Best Malayalam Film - Makaramanju

Kerala State Television Awards
 1999 - Second Best Teleserial: Balyakalasmaranakal
 2011 - Best Documentary (Biography):  Kaviyoor Revamma

Kerala Film Critics Award
 2003 - Special Jury Award : Anyar
 2006 - Second Best Film  : Rathri Mazha
 2010 - Second Best Film : Makaramanju
 2015 - Best Screenplay : Edavappathy

Filmography

References

External links

2019 deaths
Communist Party of India (Marxist) politicians from Kerala
Kerala State Film Award winners
Malayalam film directors
Film directors from Thiruvananthapuram
Indian Communist writers
Malayalam screenwriters
Screenwriters from Thiruvananthapuram
20th-century Indian film directors
20th-century Indian politicians
21st-century Indian politicians
21st-century Indian film directors
20th-century Indian dramatists and playwrights
21st-century Indian dramatists and playwrights
Politicians from Thiruvananthapuram
1951 births